Ireland and the Barbarians have played each other six times to date. The Barbarians have won five of these matches while Ireland has only won once. Ireland's sole victory came in 2008 by a score of 39–14. The most recent encounter between the two teams was during the 2015 mid-year rugby union internationals, with the Barbarians winning by a score of 22–21. Three of the Barbarians' victories, in 2000, 2012 and 2015, have been by a single point.

Overall summary

Matches

References

Barbarian F.C. matches
Barbarians